Southern Finland was a province of Finland from 1997 to 2009. It bordered the provinces of Western Finland and Eastern Finland. It also bordered the Gulf of Finland and Russia.

History 

On September 1, 1997 the Uusimaa Province, the Kymi Province and the southern parts of the Häme Province were joined to form the new Southern Finland Province.

All the provinces of Finland were abolished on January 1, 2010.

Administration 

The State Provincial Office was a joint regional authority of seven different ministries. It promoted national and regional objectives of the State central administration. The State Provincial Office of Southern Finland employed about 380 persons. Its service offices were located in the cities of Hämeenlinna, Helsinki, and Kouvola. The administrative seat was placed at Hämeenlinna.

Regions 

Southern Finland was divided into six regions:
South Karelia (Etelä-Karjala / Södra Karelen)
Päijänne Tavastia (Päijät-Häme / Päijänne Tavastland)
Tavastia Proper (Kanta-Häme / Egentliga Tavastland)
Uusimaa (Uusimaa / Nyland)
Eastern Uusimaa (Itä-Uusimaa / Östra Nyland)
Kymenlaakso (Kymenlaakso / Kymmenedalen)

Municipalities in 2009 (cities in bold) 
Southern Finland was divided into 72 municipalities in 2009.

 Artjärvi
 Asikkala
 Askola
 Espoo
 Forssa
 Hamina
 Hanko
 Hartola
 Hattula
 Hausjärvi
 Heinola
 Helsinki
 Hollola
 Humppila
 Hyvinkää
 Hämeenkoski
 Hämeenlinna
 Iitti
 Imatra
 Ingå
 Janakkala
 Jokioinen
 Järvenpää
 Karjalohja
 Karkkila
 Kauniainen
 Kerava
 Kirkkonummi
 Kotka
 Kouvola
 Kärkölä
 Lahti
 Lapinjärvi
 Lappeenranta
 Lemi
 Liljendal
 Lohja
 Loppi
 Loviisa
 Luumäki
 Miehikkälä
 Myrskylä
 Mäntsälä
 Nastola
 Nummi-Pusula
 Nurmijärvi
 Orimattila
 Padasjoki
 Parikkala
 Pernå
 Pornainen
 Porvoo
 Pukkila
 Pyhtää
 Raseborg
 Rautjärvi
 Riihimäki
 Ruokolahti
 Ruotsinpyhtää
 Savitaipale
 Sipoo
 Siuntio
 Suomenniemi
 Sysmä
 Taipalsaari
 Tammela
 Tuusula
 Vantaa
 Vihti
 Virolahti
 Ylämaa
 Ypäjä

Former municipalities (disestablished before 2009) 

 Anjalankoski
 Ekenäs
 Elimäki
 Hauho
 Jaala
 Joutseno
 Kalvola
 Karis
 Kuusankoski
 Lammi
 Pohja
 Renko
 Saari
 Sammatti
 Tuulos
 Uukuniemi
 Valkeala
 Vehkalahti

Governors 
Tuula Linnainmaa 1997-2003
Anneli Taina 2003-2009

Heraldry 

The coat of arms of Southern Finland was composed of the arms of Tavastia, Karelia and Uusimaa.

Notes

External links 
Southern Finland State Provincial Office - Official site

 
Provinces of Finland (1997–2009)
States and territories established in 1997
States and territories disestablished in 2009